Agama lanzai is a species of lizard in the family Agamidae. It is a small lizard endemic to Somalia. It is similar to Agama bottegi. It is named after Benedetto Lanza.

References

Agama (genus)
Agamid lizards of Africa
Reptiles of Somalia
Endemic fauna of Somalia
Reptiles described in 2013
Taxa named by Wolfgang Böhme (herpetologist)
Taxa named by Philipp Wagner